Roberta is Roberta Flack's fourteenth album, released in 1994. It consists of cover versions of jazz and soul standards.  It was also her final album for Atlantic Records after twenty five years with the label since her debut.

Track listing
"Let's Stay Together" (Al Green, Al Jackson Jr., Willie Mitchell) - 4:55
"Sweet Georgia Brown" (Ben Bernie, Kenneth Casey, Maceo Pinkard; Additional Lyrics: Jerry Barnes, Katreese Barnes, Roberta Flack) - 5:14
"The Thrill Is Gone" (Rick Darnell, Roy Hawkins) - 5:14
"It Might Be You" (Alan and Marilyn Bergman, Dave Grusin) - 10:03
"In a Sentimental Mood" (Duke Ellington, Irving Mills, Manny Kurtz) - 3:08
"Looking for Another Pure Love" (Stevie Wonder) - 4:50
"I Don't Care Who Knows (Baby I'm Yours)" (Buddy Johnson, Ella Johnson) - 4:05
"Prelude to a Kiss [Intro]" - 0:43
"Prelude to a Kiss" (Ellington, Mills, Benny Golson, Irving Gordon) (Rap Intro by Gabrielle Goodman) - 4:27
"Angel Eyes" (Earl K. Brent, Matt Dennis) - 6:35
"Tenderly" (Walter Gross, Jack Lawrence) - 3:48
"A Cottage for Sale" (Larry Conley, Willard Robison) - 4:37
"Isn't It Romantic?" (Richard Rodgers, Lorenz Hart) - 3:42
"My Romance" (Rodgers, Hart) - 5:39
"You'll Never Know ('Til You Let Go)" (Jerry Barnes, Katreese Barnes, Roberta Flack, Barry Miles) - 5:20

Personnel 
 Roberta Flack – lead and backing vocals, arrangements (1, 2, 6, 7, 12)
 Katreese Barnes – acoustic piano (1, 12), backing vocals (1-6, 15), arrangements (1, 2, 4, 5, 6, 12), keyboards (2-6), saxophone (2, 3, 6, 13), synthesizers (4, 12)
 Bernard Wright – acoustic piano (1, 3), synth pad (1), clavinet (3), synth solo (3), additional keyboards (4), keyboards (5, 7, 9), backing vocals (5), arrangements (7), synth bass (9), Moog bass (12)
 Ruy Folguera – synthesizer arrangements (1)
 Kenny Barron – acoustic piano (4, 10, 11, 13), arrangements (10, 11, 13)
 Richard Keller – keyboard programming (4), additional keyboards (9), synthesizer programming (9), drum programming (9)
 Barry Miles – keyboards (7, 15), arrangements (7, 14, 15), acoustic piano (14)
 Hiram Bullock – guitar (1)
 Phil Hamilton – guitar (2, 3, 6, 7), electric guitar solo (4)
 Paul Pesco – acoustic guitar (4), electric guitar (4)
 Paul Pimsler – guitar (12)
 Jerry Barnes – bass (1-6), backing vocals (1-6, 15), arrangements (1-4, 6, 12), guitar (2, 5), drum programming (2, 4, 5, 6), additional synthesizers (4), electric bass (7), vocal arrangements (15), vocal supervision (15)
 Ray Drummond – bass (4, 10, 11, 13)
 Anthony Jackson – electric bass (14, 15)
 Ivan Hampden Jr. – drums (1)
 Steve Jordan – drums (2)
 William "JuJu" House – drums (3), drum fills (5), congas (6)
 Ben Riley – drums (4, 10, 11, 13)
 Buddy Williams – hi-hat cymbal (5), drums (7, 12)
 Shane Keister – drum programming (9), Moog bass (12), synthesizer programming (15)
 Allan Schwartzberg – drums (15)
 Steve Kroon – percussion (1, 5, 6)
 Steve Thornton – percussion (1, 3, 10-13), timbales (5)
 Gary Fritz – percussion (2)
 Bashiri Johnson – percussion (4, 15)
 Roger Byam – tenor saxophone (12), saxophone (13)
 Jamal Haynes – trombone (13)
 Aaron Flagg – trumpet (2, 6, 13)
 Randy Brecker – flugelhorn (15)
 The Duke Ellington Orchestra – musical intro (9)
 Andre Smith – backing vocals (4)
 Tony Terry – backing vocals (4)
 Gwen Guthrie – backing vocals (15)
 Curtis King – backing vocals (15)

Production 
 Roberta Flack – producer 
 Katreese Barnes – co-producer (1, 2, 3, 5, 6, 10, 11, 13), producer (4)
 Jerry Barnes – co-producer (1, 2, 3, 5, 6, 10, 11, 13), mixing (2, 3, 5), producer (4), engineer (5, 7)
 Shane Keister – co-producer (7, 8, 9, 14, 15)
 Barry Miles – co-producer (7, 8, 9, 14, 15)
 Richard Keller – co-producer (8, 9), mixing (8, 9)
 Bernard Wright – co-producer (8, 9)
 Ahmet Ertegun – executive producer 
 Dana Mars – engineer (1, 2, 3, 5, 6, 7, 12, 13)
 Stanley Wallace – engineer (1-5, 7, 10-15)
 John Angelini – assistant engineer 
 Grant Dickins – assistant engineer
 Jonathan Mooney – assistant engineer
 Al Theurer – assistant engineer
 Goh Hotoda – mixing (1, 12)
 Butch Jones – mixing (2)
 Russell Elevado – mixing (3)
 Ray Bardani – mixing (4)
 John Jaszcz – mixing (6)
 Frank Filipetti – mixing (7, 10, 13, 14, 15)
 Randy Brown – technical assistant 
 Ben Newberry – technical assistant
 Greg Calbi – mastering 
 Joan Martin – production coordinator 
 Darren Crawforth – art direction, design 
 STAIN – art direction, design 
 Kim Taylor Reece – photography
 David Nathan – liner notes 
 Magic Lady – management

Studios 
 Recorded at Duplex Studios, The Hit Factory, Soundtrack Studios, Clinton Recording Studios, Atlantic Studios, Right Track Recording, Room With A View and Back Pocket Studios (New York City, New York); LGK Studios (Leonia, New Jersey).
 Mixed at Clinton Recording Studios, Right Track Recording, Room With A View and Sound On Sound (New York City, New York).
 Mastered at Masterdisk (New York City, New York).

References

1994 albums
Roberta Flack albums
Covers albums
Atlantic Records albums